Duseberg Buttress is a conspicuous rocky cone,  high, standing at the southwest side of Mount Scott on the west coast of Graham Land, Antarctica. It was discovered by the Belgian Antarctic Expedition, 1897–99, and named "Cap Duseberg" by Gerlache. Aerial photos show no cape, only a rock buttress, evidently the feature Gerlache intended to name.

References 

Rock formations of Graham Land
Danco Coast